Tanuku railway station (station code: TNKU), provides rail connectivity to the town of Tanuku in West Godavari district of Andhra Pradesh. It is administered under Vijayawada railway division of South Coast Railway Zone.

Classification 
In terms of earnings and outward passengers handled, Tanuku is categorized as a Non-Suburban Grade-5 (NSG-5) railway station. Based on the re–categorization of Indian Railway stations for the period of 2017–18 and 2022–23, an NSG–5 category station earns between – crore and handles  passengers.

Amenities 
SCR recently installed Automatic Ticket Vending Machines (ATVM)s in this station. This station also has a First class waiting room,
Free Safe drinking water. Free Wifi hotspots are being considered

References 

Railway stations in West Godavari district
Vijayawada railway division